Waifer is a masculine Germanic given name, also rendered Waifar, Waiofar, Guaifer or Guaifar. It is rendered in French as Waifre, Waiffre, Gaifier or Guyver, and in Italian as Guaiferio. It may refer to:
Waifer of Aquitaine (duke, 748–67)
Guaifer of Salerno (prince, 861–80)
Guaifer of Benevento (prince, 878–81)